Goderdzi Shvelidze (born 17 April 1978, in Rustavi) is a former Georgian rugby union player. He played as a prop. 

He played for the Georgian Army club and the Georgia national rugby union team. He played at club level in France for Béziers, Clermont Auvergne, Montauban, Montpellier, and Brive.

He had 64 caps for Georgia, with 7 tries, 35 points on aggregate.

Notes

1978 births
ASM Clermont Auvergne players
Montpellier Hérault Rugby players
Rugby union players from Georgia (country)
Rugby union props
Living people
People from Rustavi
Expatriate rugby union players from Georgia (country)
Expatriate rugby union players in France
Expatriate sportspeople from Georgia (country) in France
Georgia international rugby union players